Mountain Laurel Center for the Performing Arts is a nonprofit performing arts center situated at Bushkill in the Pocono Mountains area of Pennsylvania, USA.

The principal venue is the Tom Ridge Pavilion, an Amphitheatre with a covered seating capacity of 2,509. In addition, the lawn has an uncovered seating capacity of 7,500 for a total of up to 10,009 seats.

History

After a series of financial issues since opening in 2003, the center's board dissolved itself in March 2008 and handed the property back to its owner, Wolfington Companies.

After a three-year hiatus, Wolfington and O'Neil Property Group hired The Total Concert Team to manage the 2011 season, and they produced 4 concerts.

The 2012 season was managed by Christopher Perrotti, and consisted of 10 shows.

The last public concert at the center was August 24, 2012. Since the end of the 2012 season, the facility has been used primarily for community events, including community day and graduation ceremonies for the local high school.

References

External links
 
 
 Official Facebook

Performing arts centers in Pennsylvania
Theatres in Pennsylvania
Buildings and structures in Pike County, Pennsylvania
Tourist attractions in Pike County, Pennsylvania